The California Incline is a slanted road in Santa Monica, California, connecting Ocean Avenue with State Route 1 (Pacific Coast Highway or PCH). It technically is the last link, the western end of California Avenue, a minor east–west street in Santa Monica.

History and overview
The California Incline was originally a walkway known as Sunset Trail, which was cut through the bluffs to provide beach access to pedestrians in 1896. A roadway structure  in length was built in 1932. It is a vital street in Santa Monica, linking the PCH with Ocean Avenue and California Avenue, bisecting Palisades Park. It begins at an intersection with Ocean Avenue and California Avenue, at the top of the Palisades, extending to the PCH at the base of the bluffs.

2015–16 reconstruction
The California Incline was identified as structurally deficient in the early 1990s. In 2007, the City of Santa Monica secured federal highway funds to replace the structure with one meeting current seismic standards. The project cost $17 million, with 88.5% coming from federal funds and the balance from local funds. Construction began in April 2015 and took 17 months to complete. The roadway reopened to the public on September 1, 2016. The rebuilt structure includes wider sidewalks and bicycle lanes.

Popular culture
The California Incline has been featured in various films, including It's a Mad, Mad, Mad, Mad World (1963) and Knocked Up (2007).  It was also featured in the hardboiled crime novel, In a Lonely Place (1942), written by Dorothy B. Hughes. It was also portrayed in the popular video games Midnight Club: LA, Grand Theft Auto V, and Grand Theft Auto: San Andreas.

See also
 McClure Tunnel

References

Streets in Santa Monica, California